Tapeina dispar is a species of beetle in the family Cerambycidae. It was described by Amédée Louis Michel Lepeletier and Jean Guillaume Audinet-Serville in 1828. It is known from Brazil, Argentina and Paraguay.

References

Lamiinae
Beetles described in 1828
Taxa named by Amédée Louis Michel le Peletier
Taxa named by Jean Guillaume Audinet-Serville